Graham is a given name in the English language. It is derived from the surname.

Origins
The surname Graham is an Anglo-French form of the name of the town of Grantham, in Lincolnshire, England. The settlement is recorded in the 11th century Domesday Book variously as Grantham, Grandham, Granham and Graham. This place name is thought to be derived from the Old English elements grand, possibly meaning "gravel", and ham, meaning "hamlet" the English word given to small settlements of smaller size than villages.

Variants and use
In the 12th century the surname was taken from England to Scotland by Sir William de Graham, who founded Clan Graham. Variant spellings of the forename are Grahame and Graeme. The forename Graham is considered to be an English and Scottish given name. Its origin as a surname has led to its occasional use as a female given name, as for example in the case of Graham Cockburn, a daughter of Henry Cockburn, Lord Cockburn.

References

External links
 

English masculine given names
English-language masculine given names
Given names originating from a surname
Scottish masculine given names